Finnmark Hospital Trust is a health trust which serves Finnmark, Norway. The trust is part of Northern Norway Regional Health Authority and headquartered in Hammerfest. It operates two hospitals, Hammerfest Hospital and Kirkenes Hospital. In addition it operates a decentralized psychiatric service.

References

Health trusts of Norway
Companies based in Finnmark
2002 establishments in Norway
Hospitals established in 2002
Government agencies established in 2002